Inca is a genus of beetles belonging to the family Scarabaeidae.

Species
 Inca besckii Schaum, 1840
 Inca bonplandi (Gyllenhaal, 1817)
 Inca burmeisteri Burmeister, 1847
 Inca clathratus (Olivier, 1792)
 Inca irroratus Chevrolat, 1833
 Inca pulverulentus (Olivier, 1789)

References

Cetoniinae
Scarabaeidae genera